Mikel Merino Zazón (born 22 June 1996) is a Spanish professional footballer who plays as a midfielder for La Liga club Real Sociedad and the Spain national team.

After starting out at Osasuna, he went on to play for Borussia Dortmund, Newcastle United and Real Sociedad.

Merino represented Spain in two European Under-21 Championships, winning the 2019 edition. He made his full debut in 2020.

Club career

Osasuna
Born in Pamplona, Navarre, Merino began his career with CD Amigó, later moving to CA Osasuna. He made his senior debut with the reserves in the 2013–14 season, in the Tercera División.

On 23 August 2014, Merino made his first competitive appearance with the first team, starting in a 2–0 home win against FC Barcelona B in the Segunda División. He scored his first professional goal on 21 December, the winner in a 2–1 away victory over UD Las Palmas.

Merino was definitely promoted to the main squad on 31 January 2015, being awarded the number 8 jersey. He was a regular starter in his first year, helping them to narrowly avoid relegation.

In the 2015–16 campaign, Merino scored four goals from 34 appearances as Osasuna finished sixth and reached the promotion play-offs. In that stage's first round, he netted a brace in a 3–1 home win against Gimnàstic de Tarragona, and added another goal in the second leg (3–2 victory).

Borussia Dortmund
On 15 February 2016, Merino signed a five-year deal with Borussia Dortmund, which was made effective on 1 July. His first appearance in the Bundesliga occurred on 14 October, when he played the full 90 minutes in a 1–1 home draw with Hertha BSC.

Newcastle United
In July 2017, Merino joined Newcastle United on a season-long loan; the Premier League club agreed to a clause obligating them to sign the player permanently, based on a number of appearances. On 13 October this was invoked, and he agreed to a five-year contract.

Merino made 25 competitive appearances for the Magpies, scoring once, a late header that was the only goal against Crystal Palace at St James' Park on 21 October 2017. He also provided a sole assist.

Real Sociedad
Merino returned to Spain on 12 July 2018, signing a five-year deal with Real Sociedad for an undisclosed fee reported to be €12 million. His first match in La Liga took place on 18 August when he played 59 minutes in a 2–1 win against hosts Villarreal CF, and his first goal on 21 September won the game at SD Huesca. Despite struggling initially to adapt to his new team, also dealing with some injury problems, he eventually became a starter, scoring four times in 32 fixtures in his first season. 

On 7 March 2020, Merino wore the captain's armband for the first time in a 1–0 league defeat away to FC Barcelona. In July, he renewed his contract until 2025.

On 3 April 2021, Merino won his first title after playing the full 90 minutes of the 2020 Copa del Rey Final – delayed due to the COVID-19 pandemic – against Athletic Bilbao, assisting Portu who was brought down in the box at the hour mark; Mikel Oyarzabal converted from the spot for the only goal at the Estadio de La Cartuja, and Merino was chosen Player of the match.

International career
Merino was part of the Spain under-19 team which won the 2015 UEFA European Championship in Greece. He scored their first goal of the tournament, opening a 3–0 win over holders Germany at the AEL FC Arena in Larissa. He received his first call up to the senior side on 20 August 2020 for the initial two matches of the 2020–21 UEFA Nations League against Germany and Ukraine, earning his first cap against the former on 3 September by replacing Sergio Busquets early into the second half of a 1–1 draw.

Personal life
Merino's father, Ángel, was also a footballer. His career was also associated with Osasuna, as both a player and manager.

Career statistics

Club

International

Honours
Real Sociedad
Copa del Rey: 2019–20

Spain U19
UEFA European Under-19 Championship: 2015

Spain U21
UEFA European Under-21 Championship: 2019; runner-up 2017

Spain Olympic
Summer Olympics silver medal: 2020

Spain
UEFA Nations League runner-up: 2020–21

Individual
Segunda División Player of the Month: June 2016

References

External links

Osasuna official profile 

1996 births
Living people
Spanish footballers
Footballers from Pamplona
Association football midfielders
La Liga players
Segunda División players
Tercera División players
CA Osasuna B players
CA Osasuna players
Real Sociedad footballers
Bundesliga players
Borussia Dortmund players
Premier League players
Newcastle United F.C. players
Spain youth international footballers
Spain under-21 international footballers
Spain under-23 international footballers
Spain international footballers
Olympic footballers of Spain
Footballers at the 2020 Summer Olympics
Olympic medalists in football
Olympic silver medalists for Spain
Medalists at the 2020 Summer Olympics
Spanish expatriate footballers
Expatriate footballers in Germany
Expatriate footballers in England
Spanish expatriate sportspeople in Germany
Spanish expatriate sportspeople in England